Nano (Abbreviation: XNO; sign: Ӿ) is a cryptocurrency. The nano cryptocurrency is based on a directed acyclic graph data structure and distributed ledger, making it possible for Nano to work without intermediaries. To agree on what transactions to commit (i.e. achieving consensus), it uses a voting system with weight based on the amount of currency accounts hold.

Nano was launched in October 2015 by Colin LeMahieu to address the Bitcoin scalability problem and was created with the intention to reduce confirmation times and fees. The currency implements no-fee transactions and achieves confirmation in under one second.

History
Colin LeMahieu started the development of Nano in 2014 under its original name "RaiBlocks". A year later, RaiBlocks was distributed for free through a captcha-secured faucet. In 2017, after 126,248,289 RaiBlocks were distributed, the faucet shut down. This fixed the total supply to 133,248,297 RaiBlocks, after an addition of a 7,000,000 RaiBlocks developer fund.

Rebrand to Nano 

On January 31, 2018, RaiBlocks was rebranded to Nano.

BitGrail hack 
On 9 February 2018, an Italian cryptocurrency exchange BitGrail announced its hack and eventual shutdown. Users were prevented from accessing assets stored on the platform, which was collectively worth 17 million Nano. The victims then launched a class-action lawsuit against BitGrail owner Francesco Firano for recoupment, inside the Florence Courthouse. The exchange was ruled to be found guilty in January 2019, as it was found to fail at implementing safeguards and reporting losses. The Italian police branch Network Operations Command (Italy) alleged the Bitgrail founder had conducted fraud. Nano prices had been around $10 prior to the hack and after the hack fell to $0.10.

Design
Nano uses a block-lattice data structure, where every account has its own blockchain for storing transactions. It is the first cryptocurrency to use a directed acyclic graph data structure, by having a "block" consisting of only one transaction and the account's current balance.

Consensus is reached through an algorithm similar to proof of stake. In this system, the voting weight is distributed to accounts based on the amount of Nano they hold; accounts then freely delegate this weight to a peer (node) of their choice. No mining of cryptocurrency is needed.

If two contradictory transactions are broadcast to the network, indicating a double-spend attempt, nodes will then vote for either the transactions. Afterwards, they broadcast their vote to the other nodes for strictly informational purpose. The first to reach 67% of the total voting weight is confirmed, while the other transaction is discarded.

References

2015 software
Application layer protocols
Cryptocurrency projects
Currencies introduced in 2015
Private currencies